Scott Anderson (June 26, 1913 – October 1, 2006) was the founder of Anderson Physics Laboratory in Urbana, Illinois
(the predecessor of APL Engineered Materials), a leading provider of metal halides and amalgams to the lighting industry.  He received 11 U.S. patents.

He received his B.S. from Illinois Wesleyan University in 1935, M.S. from the University of Illinois in 1937, and Ph.D. from the University of Illinois 1940.  During World War II, he worked in the Manhattan Project's  Metallurgical Laboratory.

Anderson was a Rotarian and served as the President of the Rotary Club of Champaign, Illinois from 1963 to 1964.  He was a founder of the Urban League of Champaign County and also was instrumental in establishing Project Goodstart (meals for disadvantaged children) and New Beginnings (assistance for released felons in fitting back into civilian society).

References

External links
Scott Anderson's Obituary
Notice in Physics Illinois News, 2007, Number 1, Page 15
APL Engineered Materials
Process relating to ultra-pure metal halide particles
Process for producing sodium amalgam particles
Strengthening agent, strengthened metal halide particles, and improved lamp fill material
To Scott Anderson, Sr., for his innovative use of scientific knowledge and engineering skills in the production of new and useful materials.

1913 births
2006 deaths
People from Urbana, Illinois
Illinois Wesleyan University alumni
American physical chemists
Grainger College of Engineering alumni
Manhattan Project people
Fellows of the American Physical Society